Jerome S. "J.S." Spevack was an American scientist, inventor, and engineer who developed the "dual temperature exchange sulphide process" (known as the Girdler sulfide process) in 1943 while working on the Manhattan Project. This is regarded as the most cost-effective process for producing heavy water.  A parallel development of this process was also achieved in 1943 by German physical chemist Karl-Hermann Geib.

Post-war period 

References 

Canadian inventors
Canadian physical chemists
Heavy water reactors
Manhattan Project people
Year of birth missing
Year of death missing
American physical chemists
20th-century American inventors